1868 was the 82nd season of cricket in England since the foundation of Marylebone Cricket Club (MCC). It featured the first organised group of Australian sportspeople to travel overseas, being an all-Aboriginal cricket team.

Playing record (by county) 

Owing to an exceptionally hot and dry summer, and the absence of the forthcoming revolution of the heavy roller, 1868 was to be the last season in which every county match was finished outright.

Leading batsmen (qualification 10 innings)

Leading bowlers (qualification 800 balls)

Events 
 A team of Aboriginal Australians was the first overseas side to tour England, under the auspices of Sydney publican/cricketer Charles Lawrence. They were not a first class team.
 25–26 May: Edward Tylecote hits the first recorded score of 300 in any grade of cricket with 404 for Classicals against Moderns at Clifton College
 20 June: C.A. Absolom became the first player to be given out obstructing the field when playing for Cambridge University v. Surrey at The Oval.
 3–5 August: Playing for South of the Thames v North of the Thames at Canterbury, W.G. Grace became the second player to score two centuries in a match after William Lambert in 1817.
 The Cattle Market Ground in Islington, the original home of Middlesex County Cricket Club, was sold by its owner for development following the season. The last game, on 5 and 6 October, was between "Gentlemen of Middlesex" and a 22 called "The Clowns". Middlesex were not to have another home until the equally short-lived Prince's Cricket Ground opened.

Notes 
Hampshire, though regarded until 1885 as first-class, played no inter-county matches between 1868 and 1869 or 1871 and 1874.

References

Annual reviews 
 John Lillywhite's Cricketer's Companion (Green Lilly), Lillywhite, 1869
 Arthur Haygarth, Scores & Biographies, Volume 10 (1867–1868), Lillywhite, 1869

External links 
 CricketArchive – season summaries

1868 in English cricket
English cricket seasons in the 19th century